Dorrian is a surname. Notable people with the surname include:

 Alex Dorrian (born 1946), Scottish businessman
 Jim Dorrian (born 1931), American soccer player
 Lee Dorrian (born 1968), English singer, 
 Leeona Dorrian, Lady Dorrian (born 1957), Scottish judge
 Patrick Dorrian (1814–1885) was an Irish Roman Catholic Prelate, 23rd Lord Bishop of Down and Connor

See also
 Dorrian's
 Dorian (disambiguation)
 Dorrien